Bureng (also Romanized as Būreng, Baurang, and Būrang) is a village in Miyandasht Rural District of Miyandasht District, Darmian County, South Khorasan province, Iran. At the 2006 National Census, its population was 2,099 in 474 households. The following census in 2011 counted 2,772 people in 747 households. The latest census in 2016 showed a population of 2,276 people in 687 households; it was the largest village in its rural district. After the census, Burring became the capital of the newly formed Miyandasht District.

References 

Darmian County

Populated places in South Khorasan Province

Populated places in Darmian County